Russell Elmer Edlefsen (September 30, 1906 – December 1986) served four terms as mayor of Boise, Idaho, from 1951 to 1959. Elected to two-year terms, Edlefsen was the only person in to win four consecutive terms as Boise mayor until David H. Bieter accomplished the feat in 2015.

References

Sources
Mayors of Boise - Past and Present
Idaho State Historical Society Reference Series, Corrected List of Mayors, 1867-1996
Guide to the Russell E.Edlefsen Scrapbooks 1951-1959

Mayors of Boise, Idaho
1906 births
1986 deaths
20th-century American politicians